This is a list of Ghanaian regions by population, ranked according to the latest census, which took place on 26 September 2010. Past census data (1960, 1970, 1984, and 2000) is included for comparison.

(Note: The current boundaries of Ghana's administrative regions were not fully established until 1983. As such, population figures for 1960 and 1970 reflect the analysis of subregional census data from those periods.)

See also
Regions of Ghana
List of Ghanaian regional ministers
List of Ghanaian regions by area

References

External links 
 Ghana Statistical Service Official Website
 GSS 2010 Population Statistics Page
 Demographic, Social, Economic and Housing Characteristics Report

Regions
Ghana, Regions of, by population
Ghana, population
 by population